Drama from Ancient Life  is a 1971 Soviet drama film directed by Ilya Averbakh. Based on the story of Nikolai Leskov The Dumbass Artist.

Plot 
The story of the lovers of one another, the count's hairdresser Arkady and the serf actress Lyuba unfolds in an environment that fancifully combines dense wildness with an external gloss, barbarism - with the appearance of enlightenment. Young people manage to escape, but their happiness is not destined to come true.

Cast 
 Yelena Solovey as Lyuba
  Anatoly Yegorov  as Arkady
 Yevgeny Perov as Count Kamensky
 Sofya Pavlova as Drosida
 Aleksandr Khlopotov as Kamensky Jr.
 Lyudmila Arinina as mammy
 Rasmi Djabrailov	as Khraposhka
 Felix Antipov as a priest
 Aleksandr Demyanenko as Yeroshka
 Viktor Ilichyov as Afanaska

References

External links 
 

1971 films
1970s Russian-language films
Soviet drama films
Films based on Russian novels
Films directed by Ilya Averbakh
Lenfilm films
1971 drama films
Films based on works by Nikolai Leskov